Kim Un-hyang may refer to:

 Kim Un-hyang (gymnast) (born 1990), North Korean artistic gymnast
 Kim Un-hyang (diver) (born 1991), North Korean diver
 Kim Un-hyang (ice hockey) (born 1992), North Korean ice hockey player